RTL Croatia World is an international TV channel dedicated to Croats living outside Croatia operated by the CME Group as of 1 June 2022. The channel was launched on 11 July 2016.

RTL Croatia World focuses its programming on news and entertainment, bringing the shows and series of RTL Televizija, RTL 2 and RTL Kockica to its audience.

Distribution
The channel is available via Euro World Network in North America, Canada, Australia and New Zealand, A1 Telekom Austria in Austria, Flip TV in Australia, SBB in Serbia and via NetTV Plus.

References

External links
 

Television channels in Croatia
RTL Group
Television channels and stations established in 2016
2016 establishments in Croatia
Croatian-language television stations
International broadcasters
Mass media in Zagreb
Television channels in North Macedonia